Mymar pulchellum is a species of fairyfly within the family Mymaridae found in Sweden. The species is diurnal and parasitizes Fagus sylvatica and Medicago sativa.

References 

Insects described in 1832
Insects of Europe
Mymaridae